Suzannah Wilson Bates (born 16 September 1987) is a New Zealand cricketer and former captain of national women cricket team. Born at Dunedin, she plays domestic cricket for the Otago Sparks, as well as playing for the White Ferns. She currently holds the highest score and highest batting average in the New Zealand Women's Twenty20 cricket team. She won the ICC Women's ODI Cricketer of the Year 2013. Bates again won ICC Women's ODI and T20I Cricketer of the Year 2015.

Basketball
Bates represented New Zealand in Women's basketball during the 2008 Summer Olympics.
Suzie played professional basketball for the :fr:Christchurch Sirens in the Australian Women's National Basketball League (WNBL), starting 24 games between 2007 and 2008, before moving to the Otago Gold Rush in 2009 and the Logan Thunder (WNBL) in 2009/10.

Bates joined the Otago Nuggets as an assistant coach for the 2021 New Zealand NBL season.

Cricket

On 8 June 2018, she scored her tenth century in WODIs, with 151 runs against Ireland. In the same match, she also became the leading run-scorer for New Zealand Women in WODIs, passing Debbie Hockley's total of 4,064 runs. On 20 June 2018, during the match against South Africa Women in the 2018 England women's Tri-Nation Series, Bates scored her first century in WT20I cricket. In the same match, she also became the leading run-scorer in the format, passing Charlotte Edwards' total of 2,605 runs. In the sixth match of the tri-series, Bates became the second woman, after Jenny Gunn, to play in 100 WT20I matches.

In August 2018, she was awarded a central contract by New Zealand Cricket, following the tours of Ireland and England in the previous months. In September 2018, she stepped down as captain of New Zealand and was replaced by Amy Satterthwaite.

In October 2018, she was named in New Zealand's squad for the 2018 ICC Women's World Twenty20 tournament in the West Indies. Ahead of the tournament, she was named as one of the players to watch. During the tournament, she became the first cricketer, male or female, to score 3,000 runs in Twenty20 International matches. She was the leading run-scorer for New Zealand in the tournament, with 161 runs in four matches. Following the conclusion of the tournament, she was named as the standout player in the team by the International Cricket Council (ICC).

In November 2018, she was named in the Adelaide Strikers' squad for the 2018–19 Women's Big Bash League season. In January 2020, she was named in New Zealand's squad for the 2020 ICC Women's T20 World Cup in Australia. In September 2020, in the first match against Australia, Bates took her 50th wicket in WT20I cricket.

In November 2020, Bates was nominated for the Rachael Heyhoe-Flint Award for ICC Female Cricketer of the Decade, and the award for women's ODI cricketer of the decade. In February 2022, she was named in New Zealand's team for the 2022 Women's Cricket World Cup in New Zealand.

In April 2022, Bates was named the Super Smash Player of the Year at the annual Otago Cricket Awards. In June 2022, Bates was named in New Zealand's team for the cricket tournament at the 2022 Commonwealth Games in Birmingham, England.

International centuries

Overview 
As of the conclusion of the Women's Cricket World Cup hosted by New Zealand in April 2022, Bates held the record for the most WODI centuries by a New Zealander with 12 in total, and was second only to Meg Lanning of Australia overall. She had also scored a single Women's Twenty20 International century. Her highest WODI and international score was her second WODI century, a score of 168 against Pakistan, at Drummoyne Oval, Sydney, Australia, on 19 March 2009, during that year's Women's Cricket World Cup.

Bates became the sole holder of the record for the most WODI centuries by a New Zealander, which she had previously shared with Debbie Hockley, on 6 October 2013, when she recorded her fifth WODI century, a score of 110 against the West Indies at Sabina Park, Kingston, Jamaica, to lead New Zealand to victory by just one run in the first match of a three WODI bilateral series. On 8 June 2018, upon reaching her tenth WODI century, which ultimately became a total score of 151 runs against Ireland at the YMCA Cricket Club, Dublin, Bates also surpassed Hockley's record for the most WODI runs by a New Zealander.

One Day International centuries

T20 International centuries

Awards
 ICC Women's ODI Cricketer of the Year – 2013
 Wisden Leading Woman Cricketer in the World – 2015
 ICC Women's ODI Cricketer of the Year – 2016
 ICC Women's T20I Cricketer of the Year – 2016

References

Further reading

External links

1987 births
Living people
Cricketers from Dunedin
New Zealand women cricketers
New Zealand women One Day International cricketers
New Zealand women Twenty20 International cricketers
New Zealand women cricket captains
New Zealand women's Twenty20 International captains
New Zealand women's One Day International captains
Point guards
New Zealand women's basketball players
Olympic basketball players of New Zealand
Basketball players at the 2008 Summer Olympics
Otago Sparks cricketers
Kent women cricketers
Hampshire women cricketers
Southern Vipers cricketers
Oval Invincibles cricketers
Western Australia women cricketers
South Australian Scorpions cricketers
Perth Scorchers (WBBL) cricketers
Adelaide Strikers (WBBL) cricketers
Sydney Sixers (WBBL) cricketers
IPL Trailblazers cricketers
Ngāi Tahu people
New Zealand Māori sportspeople
New Zealand Māori cricket team players
New Zealand expatriate basketball people in Australia
Wisden Leading Woman Cricketers in the World
Cricketers at the 2022 Commonwealth Games
Commonwealth Games bronze medallists for New Zealand
Commonwealth Games medallists in cricket
New Zealand expatriate sportspeople in England
Medallists at the 2022 Commonwealth Games